Kayo Sports is an over-the-top video streaming subscription service available in Australia, owned by Streamotion (a wholly owned subsidiary of Foxtel). The service offers sports live and on demand from Fox Sports, ESPN, beIN Sports, and Racing.com.

History
In March 2018 it was reported Foxtel were investigating an over-the-top sports streaming service to appeal to customers not willing to subscribe to traditional satellite or cable. At the time the service had reportedly been in development for more than nine months but was yet to be green lit. It was reported the new service would not use the Foxtel branding. In August 2018 it was reported Foxtel had green lit this new sports streaming service, which was code named Project Martian. It was predicted the service would launch in late 2018 coinciding with a cricket event following Foxtel's recent new six year broadcasting deal with Cricket Australia. In October 2018, it was reported the service was originally planned to launch in early November but was delayed until early December in order to conduct further testing to avoid technical issues similar to those experienced by Optus Sport for the 2018 FIFA World Cup. On 5 November 2018 it was reported Foxtel were exploring including ESPN and beIN Sports in the service which was rumored to be called Kayo Sports.

On 9 November 2018, it was formally announced the new service would be called Kayo Sports and launched in beta that day. At launch, the service offered over 50 sports from Fox Sports, ESPN and beIN Sports networks live and on demand. Foxtel CEO Patrick Delany described the service as the "Netflix of sport". Following a positive reception to the beta launch, Kayo Sports officially launched on 26 November 2018.

On 6 May 2019 Kayo Sports added Racing.com.

In February 2021 it was announced Telstra (part owner of parent company Foxtel) would be replacing their Telstra Live Pass service in the National Rugby League and Australian Football League mobile apps which offered streaming of games with access to Kayo Sports.

As of May 2021 it was announced that Kayo Sports has exceeded 1 million total subscribers, with paying subscribers expected to reach that milestone imminently.

Subscribers

Channels 
The following channels are available on Kayo Sports:

 Fox Sports News
 Fox Cricket
 Fox League
 Fox Footy
 Fox Netball
 Fox Sports
Fox Sports 503
Fox Sports 506
Fox Sports More+
Fox Sports 508
ESPN
ESPN
ESPN2
beIN Sports
beIN Sports 1
beIN Sports 2
beIN Sports 3
Racing.com

Content

Original programming
Kayo Sports' first original program Below the Bonnet premiered on 25 March 2021. The weekly Supercars Championship themed talk show is hosted by David Reynolds and Michael Caruso.

Availability
Kayo Sports offers a three tier subscription model (one, basic or premium), the difference being the number of simultaneous device streams(1 for one, 2 for basic, 3 for premium). Kayo Sports is available via web browser, mobile app (Android and iOS), and on selected smart televisions and media consoles.

Kayo Freebies
In January 2021 Kayo Sports announced they would be offering free access to selected sports and programs under the banner Kayo Freebies as a way of increasing subscribers. Sports included under the banner include: the Mount Panorama 500, selected A-League games, selected W-League games, two Suncorp Super Netball games a round plus Australian Diamonds games, and all sports supported under the Federal Government's Women's, Niche and Other Under-Represented Sports grants.

See also

Foxtel Now
Binge
List of sports television channels
List of streaming media services

References

External links

2018 establishments in Australia
Sports television networks in Australia
Internet properties established in 2018
Subscription video streaming services
Foxtel
Australian subscription television services